Clayton Historic District can refer to:

 Clayton Historic District (Clayton, New York), listed on the National Register of Historic Places (NRHP) in Jefferson County, New York
 Clayton Historic District (Clayton, North Carolina), listed on the NRHP in Johnston County, North Carolina